Twogether is a 1992 American romantic comedy-drama film written and directed by Andrew Chiaramonte and starring Nick Cassavetes and Brenda Bakke.

Cast
Nick Cassavetes as Wolfgang Amadeus 'John' Madler
Brenda Bakke as Allison McKenzie
Jeremy Piven as Arnie
Jim Beaver as Oscar
Tom Dugan as Paul
Damian London as Mark Saffron

References

External links
 

1990s romantic comedy-drama films
American romantic comedy-drama films
1992 films
1990s English-language films
1990s American films